is a railway station on the Hokuriku Railroad Ishikawa Line in the city of Kanazawa, Ishikawa Prefecture, Japan, operated by the private railway operator Hokuriku Railroad (Hokutetsu).

Lines

Station layout
The station consists of one island platform serving two tracks, connected to the station building by a level crossing. The station is staffed.

Adjacent stations

History
Nuka-Jūtakumae Station opened on 22 June 1915.

Surrounding area
 Nonoichi City Hall

See also
 List of railway stations in Japan

References

External links

  Nukajūtaku-mae Station information 

Railway stations in Ishikawa Prefecture
Railway stations in Japan opened in 1915
Hokuriku Railroad Ishikawa Line